Uncle Ebo Whyte (born James Ebo Whyte; 20 July 1954) is a Ghanaian playwright, author and motivational speaker. He is the artistic director and lead writer at Roverman Productions and has written and directed over 45 plays for stage since 2008. His plays include Not My Husband, The Day Dad Came, Unhappy Wives Confused Husbands, Dear God Comma, Rejected, Dora Why, Blackmail and many others. Ebo Whyte is also the author of the Rover Monthly Report, an inspirational magazine and has two novels: The Deal and The Perfect Couple written by him.

He's acclaimed as Ghana's most successful playwright and also as the one who has revived theatre after its long dormancy due to political upheavals.

Early life and education 
Uncle Ebo, a Fante, was born and raised in South Suntreso, Kumasi in Ghana to a feisty fishmonger mother, Baaba Esama and ex-boxer father, Mr. Whyte. He grew up the first of five boys in a competitive household and one in which his parents did not hide which of their children they favored and he was his father's favorite. Ebo Whyte was always under the pressure of comparison with his younger brother who he describes as "more handsome, more adjusted, more intelligent". He confessed that he "had a difficult battle with inferiority complex" and couldn't bring himself to answer a question in class. At age 15 his father passed away and his family lost everything to the large, extended family because those were the days before the Provisional National Defense Council (PNDC) law came into place, for when a man died intestate, which protects the widow and the children.

He was then moved to live with a maternal uncle in Accra to be able to continue onto Secondary School, and for three years he sold bread to supplement his upkeep.

He had his basic education in at South Suntreso L/A middle school, Kumasi and continued his secondary education in Accra at the Osu Presbyterian Senior High School for O' levels and self tutored for his A' levels. After that, he worked for six years to gather funds before continuing onto the University of Ghana, Legon to read statistics. He was a resident of and affiliated to the popular Commonwealth Hall, popularly called the Vandals. He later self tutored and sat for some of the professional examinations for Chartered accountants, ACCA and Professional Marketing Examinations, ICEM but decided last minute against accounting. He wanted a life of spinning stories into gold.

He worked as the head of marketing and finance in a bookselling company for a period of time before pursuing his passion as a playwright.

Career

Pre-playwright career 
He started his career post secondary school, he worked for six years with Ghana's SSNIT as a clerk, during and after his first degree he worked with Asempa Publishers and later as the head of marketing and finance with Challenge bookshop. He's also worked in the financial sector, pharmaceutical and automobile sectors of Ghana for a period of time before fully pursuing his passion as a playwright.

Early playwright career 
His introduction to theatre in secondary school, was by accident . He recounts that whilst observing his school drama club rehearsing a play, he inadvertently memorized the lines and when the cast for the main character failed to turn up for rehearsals, he stepped in and got the role. From then on, his interest was piqued. Throughout the early years of his career, theatre was treated as a hobby. After graduating University, he served as the artistic director with a theatre group which performed in schools and churches in 1974, called J-Theatre. Between 1974 and 1992, he wrote 17 plays, the first play entitled Man Must Live. However, the biggest challenge for him was his transition to commercial theatre from 1989. Between 1989 and 1992, he ventured into commercial theatre with three plays and they all failed financially—The Devil's Wife, Mr President Your Move, and Wedding Behind Closed Doors.

Roverman Productions 
In 2004, went full time into theatre, registered his company Roverman Productions and in 2008 he tried commercial theatre again with the play Unhappy Wives; Confused Husbands which was produced with a loan of 5000ghc from a friend. And this time he succeeded and since 2008 he has produced four new plays every quarter of every year until the COVID-19 pandemic disrupted activities. He and his company have since the pandemic, commenced virtual theatre, taking their works onto the internet at www.rovermanproductions.com.

He's acclaimed as Ghana's most successful playwright and also as the one who has revived theatre after its long dormancy due to political upheavals.

He has also authored two novels, The Deal  and  The Perfect Couple both available on amazon. He published The Rover Report Monthly Magazine, a lifestyle magazine which run for 74 editions.

He is a social commentator and has for over 28 years, consistently, presented on his bi-weekly program dubbed "Food for Thought" on the radio station, Joy FM.

He also hosts a once a week live Facebook session on relationships, dubbed "Encore".

Personal life 
Uncle Ebo married his wife, Florence in 1983 and the couple do not have biological children of their own but have several adopted children.

Produced plays

References 

1954 births
Ghanaian dramatists and playwrights
Living people